Great River School (GRS) is a Montessori charter school in Saint Paul, Minnesota, United States.  It functions as a primary, junior high, and high school.

Great River serves 1st through 12th grade and offers the International Baccalaureate program in its 11th and 12th grades.

References

External links

 Great River School website

Charter schools in Minnesota
Educational institutions established in 2004
High schools in Saint Paul, Minnesota
International Baccalaureate schools in Minnesota
Montessori schools in the United States
Public middle schools in Minnesota
Public high schools in Minnesota
2004 establishments in Minnesota